DPMS may refer to:

 DOS Protected Mode Services, a set of extended DOS memory management services since 1992
 VESA Display Power Management Signaling, a graphics card power management standard since 1993
 DPMS Panther Arms, a United States firearms manufacturer

See also
DBMS
PMS